North is the debut album of Darkstar. The album was released on October 18, 2010

Track listing
 "In the Wings"  – 2:53
 "Gold"  – 4:20
 "Deadness"   – 4:39
 "Aidys Girl Is a Computer"  – 5:11
 "Under One Roof"  – 4:31
 "Two Chords"  – 3:58
 "North"  – 3:53 
 "Ostkreuz"  – 2:30
 "Dear Heartbeat"  - 3:43 
 "When It's Gone" - 3:58

References

Darkstar (band) albums
2010 debut albums
Hyperdub albums